Ju Chun-Sam (주춘삼, born 3 August 1950) is a North Korean former archer who represented North Korea in archery at the 1972 Summer Olympic Games.

Olympics 

She competed in the women's individual event and finished twelfth with a score of 2349 points.

References

External links 
 Profile on worldarchery.org

1950 births
Living people
North Korean female archers
Olympic archers of North Korea
Archers at the 1972 Summer Olympics